The  was an ancient Roman bronze coin valued at one twenty-fourth of an , or half an , produced during the Roman Republican era. It was made during the beginning of Roman cast bronze coinage as the lowest valued denomination.

References

Bibliography

External links 
 
 

Coins of ancient Rome